Gnaeus Arulenus Caelius Sabinus was a Roman senator, who was active during the Year of Four Emperors. He was suffect consul in the nundinium of April through June of 69 AD as the colleague of his brother Titus Flavius Sabinus.

Gavin Townend has identified Flavius Sabinus as a nephew of the emperor Vespasian, and the son of Titus Flavius Sabinus, consul in 47, a thesis that has come to be accepted by other scholars. Tactius describes Caelius Sabinus as the brother of Flavius Sabinus, so the consul of 47 was also his father.

Life 
Little is known of Sabinus' activities before his consulate. According to Tacitus, Sabinus and his brother were appointed consuls for the second nundinium of the year 69, an arrangement that Otho did not change. However Townend, citing the evidence of an Egyptian papyrus, argued that both Sabini were intended by Nero to have been the consules ordinarii for that year, but Galba had moved them from that prestigious position in the calendar to the nundinium immediately following.

References 

1st-century Romans
Suffect consuls of Imperial Rome
Flavii Sabini